This is a list of Astro Boy chapters.

Overview
The Mighty Atom (mostly known as Astro Boy in the West) manga series was first created from 1952 to 1968. The first episode was Ambassador Atom, the last episode was Showdown on Mt. Fuji and the total number of chapters is 112. Some anime episodes weren't made in the manga, while other episodes were adapted from the manga.

Although the original, long-running, manga series was published in Shōnen Kobunsha between April 1952 and March 1968, the manga has also been serialized in the Sankei newspaper, and published in Mighty Atom Club, Second-Grader, as well as several one-shots and other specials.

Between 2002 and 2004, Dark Horse Comics released a comprehensive 23-volume set called Osamu Tezuka's Original Astro Boy, based on the 1999 Japanese language Akita Shoten collection – with the stories assembled in Tezuka’s preferred order rather than strictly chronologically.

Volumes

Lost Episodes
069. "Chi-Tan"
060. "Earth Defense Force"

External links
Tezuka in English
Comic Book Database

Astro Boy
Astro Boy